Takashi Yokoyama may refer to:

, Japanese racing driver
, Japanese swimmer
, Japanese water polo player